Lisar Rural District is a rural district (dehestan) in Kargan Rud District, Talesh County, Gilan Province, Iran. At the 2006 census, its population was 8,710, in 2,101 families. The rural district has 27 villages.

The dialect of Lisar belongs to Talysh

References 

Rural Districts of Gilan Province
Talesh County